is a Japanese professional wrestler, better known by his ring name . He is best known for his work in DDT Pro-Wrestling, where he is a former KO-D Openweight Champion and two time KO-D Tag Team Champion.

Professional wrestling career
Initially aspiring to become a sumo wrestler like his father, Ito joined the Wakamatsu stable and adopted the shikona of Asa Ito, which he later changed to Asawashi, meaning "Morning Eagle" in Japanese. However, he ended up leaving the sport due to a recurrent knee injury in January 1999. He worked as a chef until joining the Ultimo Dragon Gym in order to become a professional wrestler.

Toryumon (2000–2004)
He made his debut under his real name on September 2, 2000 in Mexico. He soon adopted the name of Toru Owashi and the character of a strong, villainous loner. After being moved along with his entire class to Toryumon 2000 Project, he went to gain victories over Shuji Kondo, Jun Ogawauchi and the Syachihoko Machines. He was made the enforcer of Hagure Gundan, also known as Aagan Iisou, a stable commanded by Kondo.

He also wrestled for Dragondoor and El Dorado Wrestling. In El Dorado he was the leader of the faction Animal Planets. Owashi won the UWA World Trios Championship with Takuya Sugawara and  Nobutaka Araya on February 27, 2008 defeating Brahman Shu & Brahman Kei and Go of the HELL DEMONS faction.

Dramatic Dream Team / DDT Pro Wrestling (2007–2010, 2012–present)
In 2007 he joined Dramatic Dream Team, where he won the KO-D Openweight Championship by beating Danshoku Dino. He defended the championship vs Poison Sawada Julie on June 25, 2006 and a second time vs Kudo on August 27, 2006, but Owashi lost the KO-D Openweight Championship to Harashima on December 29, 2006. Owashi would originally retire from professional wrestling in 2010, but came out of retirement in 2012 and returned to the promotion.

Championships and accomplishments
Dramatic Dream Team/DDT Pro-Wrestling
Ironman Heavymetalweight Championship (27 times)
Jiyūgaoka 6-Person Tag Team Championship (1 time) – with Durian Sawada Julie and Mango Fukuda
KO-D 6-Man Tag Team Championship (5 times, current) – with Akebono and Sanshiro Takagi (1), Kazuki Hirata and Sanshiro Takagi (3), and Naruki Doi and Kazuki Hirata (1)
KO-D 8-Man Tag Team Championship (1 time) – with Antonio Honda, Kazuki Hirata and Yoshihiko
KO-D Openweight Championship (1 time)
KO-D Tag Team Championship (2 times) – with Harashima and Darkside Hero
UWA World Trios Championship (1 time) – with Harashima and Yukihiro Abe
O-40 Championship (1 time)
El Dorado Wrestling
UWA World Trios Championship (1 time) – with Nobutaka Araya and Takuya Sugawara
Pro-Wrestling Basara
UWA World Trios Championship (1 time, current) – with Shuji Kondo and Takuya Sugawara
Toryumon
UWA World Trios Championship (1 time) – with Condotti Shuji and "brother" Yasshi

References

External links
Official

1975 births
Living people
Japanese male professional wrestlers
20th-century professional wrestlers
21st-century professional wrestlers
UWA World Trios Champions
Ironman Heavymetalweight Champions
Jiyūgaoka 6-Person Tag Team Champions
KO-D 6-Man Tag Team Champions
KO-D 8-Man/10-Man Tag Team Champions
KO-D Tag Team Champions
KO-D Openweight Champions